Kathleen Neal Cleaver (born May 13, 1945) is an American law professor and activist, known for her involvement with the Black Power movement and the Black Panther Party, a political and revolutionary.

Early life 
Juette Kathleen Neal was born in Dallas, Texas, on May 13, 1945. Her parents were both activists and college graduates of the University of Michigan. Her father, Ernest Eugene Neal, was a sociology professor at Wiley College in Marshall, Texas, and her mother, Pearl Juette Johnson, earned a master's degree in mathematics. Three years after Cleaver was born, her father accepted a job as the director of the Rural Life Council of Tuskegee Institute in Alabama, and they moved to a predominantly segregated, middle class community. Years later, Ernest joined the Foreign Service. The family moved abroad and lived in such countries as India, Liberia, Sierra Leone, and the Philippines. Spending time in India exposed Kathleen to different beliefs, including socialism, communism, and nationalism. The family returned to the United States after her brother died from leukaemia and the family broke apart. Cleaver attended George School, a Quaker boarding school near Philadelphia, which had just been desegregated. She graduated with honors in 1963. She continued her education at Oberlin College and later transferred to Barnard College. In 1966, she left college for a secretarial job with the New York office of the Student Nonviolent Coordinating Committee (SNCC) after her friend from childhood, Sammy Younge, had been murdered by white supremacists. The shift of the movement was characterized by the change from "Freedom Now" to "Black Power."

Black Panther Party 
Kathleen was in charge of organizing a student conference at Fisk University in Nashville, Tennessee. At the conference, she met Eldridge Cleaver, the minister of information for the Black Panther Party, who was speaking at the conference. He had just gotten out of jail where he had written Soul on Ice. She moved to San Francisco in November 1967 to join the Black Panther Party, and after Christmas, Eldridge and Kathleen married. She joined about three to four weeks after Huey Newton was charged for killing an Oakland policeman in a pre-drawn shootout. It was in San Francisco that Kathleen became the Communications Secretary for the party and worked on organizing demonstrations, creating pamphlets, holding press conferences, designing posters, and speaking at rallies and on TV. Cleaver applied everything that she learned from the SNCC to the Black Panther Party. She created the position herself, motivated by Julian Bond in SNCC. Despite the fact that over two-thirds of Black Panthers members were women, Cleaver was among a small group of women who were prominent in the Black Panther Party, which included Elaine Brown and Ericka Huggins. As communications secretary, she was the first female member of the Party's decision-making body. The position combined the role of spokesperson and press secretary. Cleaver organized the national campaign to free Huey Newton.

The first major attack against the Black Panther Party was in the 1960s by Los Angeles's first SWAT team. By 1971, almost 30 of the members of the Black Panther Party had been killed. Cleaver had a difficult time healing from the passing of so many of her colleagues and was emotionally scarred. In 1968 (the same year her husband ran for president on the Peace and Freedom ticket), she ran for California's 18th state assembly district, also as a candidate of the Peace and Freedom party. Cleaver received 2,778 votes for 4.7% of the total vote, finishing third in a four-candidate race.

As a result of their involvement with the Black Panther Party, the Cleavers were often the target of police investigations. The Cleavers' apartment was raided in 1968 before a Panther rally by the San Francisco Tactical Squad on the suspicion of hiding guns and ammunition. Later that year, Eldridge Cleaver was said to have staged an ambush of Oakland police officers during which two police officers were injured. Cleaver was wounded and fellow Black Panther member Bobby Hutton was killed in a shootout following the initial exchange of gunfire. Charged with attempted murder, he jumped bail to flee to Cuba and later went to Algeria.

When Eldridge Cleaver returned to the United States, he stated the shootout was a deliberate ambush against police. The author who broke the news of Cleaver's claim doubted its veracity because it was in the context of an uncharacteristic speech in which Cleaver stated "we need police as heroes," and said that he denounced civilian review boards of police shootings because "it is a rubber stamp for murder." The author speculated that it could have been a payoff for the Alameda County justice system, whose judge just days earlier had granted Eldridge Cleaver probation instead of prison time. Cleaver was sentenced to community service after getting charged with three counts of assault against three Oakland police officers. The PBS documentary A Huey Newton Story reported that "Bobby Hutton was shot more than twelve times after he had already surrendered and stripped down to his underwear to prove he was not armed."

During Cleaver's time with the Black Panther Party, she helped feed people, provided medical care to families, and took families to visit loved ones in prison. She also “helped put together healing retreats for women who had been in the Black Panther Party, women who had been living underground, who had been tortured, who had been exiled.”

Living in exile 

In 1969, Kathleen reunited with Eldridge in Algeria, which was a single-party socialist regime with revolutionary Third World credentials and as a result highly authoritarian. Cleaver gave birth to their first son, Maceo, soon after arriving in Algeria. A year later in 1970, she gave birth to their daughter Joju Younghi Cleaver, while the family was in North Korea. Eldridge had increasingly found himself at odds with Huey Newton, one of the party's co-founders and leaders, over the direction the group should take; Newton, recently out of jail, was channeling resources into re-establishing the community outreach "survival programmes", whereas Cleaver favoured a more direct, and at times violent, approach. In 1971, this discord led to the separation of the International Branch of the Black Panther Party, as the Cleavers formed a new organisation called the Revolutionary People's Communication Network. Cleaver returned to promoting and speaking about the organization. To accomplish this, she and the children moved back to New York. The Algerian government became disgruntled with Eldridge and the new organization, and he was forced to leave the country secretly and meet with Kathleen in Paris in 1973. Kathleen left for the United States later that year to arrange Eldridge's return and raise a defence fund. In 1974, the French government granted legal residency to the Cleavers, and the family was reunited. However, after only a year, the Cleavers moved back to the United States, where Eldridge was arrested and tried for the shoot-out in 1968 and was found guilty of assault. He was sentenced to five years' probation and 2,000 hours of community service. Cleaver went to work on the Eldridge Cleaver Defense Fund, and he was freed on bail in 1976. Eldridge's legal situation was not resolved until 1980. Throughout this time, Eldridge shifted his political views to the right.

Later life 
Kathleen Cleaver left Eldridge in 1981 and went back to university, receiving a full scholarship from Yale University. She graduated in 1984, Phi Beta Kappa and summa cum laude with a Bachelor of Arts degree in history. In 1987, she divorced Eldridge Cleaver. She had decided she wanted to become a lawyer as she watched the Watergate Hearing in the early 1970s. Therefore, she continued her education by getting her Juris Doctore from Yale Law School in 1989. After graduating, she worked for the law firm of Cravath, Swaine & Moore, and followed this work with numerous jobs, including law clerk in the United States Court of Appeals for the Third Circuit in Philadelphia under Judge A. Higginbotham, the faculty of Emory University in Atlanta, visiting faculty member at the Benjamin N. Cardozo School of Law in New York City, the Graduate School of Yale University and Sarah Lawrence College.

In 2005, Cleaver was selected an inaugural Fletcher Foundation Fellow. She then worked as a Senior Research Associate at the Yale Law School, and a Senior Lecturer in the African American Studies department at Yale University. She is currently serving as senior lecturer at Emory University School of Law. In addition to her career, she works on numerous campaigns, including freedom for death-row inmate Mumia Abu-Jamal and habeas corpus for Geronimo Pratt. Cleaver has worked for many years on and published a memoir titled Memories of Love and War. Cleaver has had her writing appear in multiple newspapers and magazines including Ramparts, The Black Panther, The Village Voice, The Boston Globe, and Transition, and she has contributed scholarly essays to the books Critical Race Feminism, Critical White Studies, The Promise of Multiculturalism, and The Black Panther Party Reconsidered. She has also helped edit essays and a writing done by Eldridge Cleaver, Target Zero: A Life in the Writing. She and other former members of the Black Panther Party continue to meet and discuss issues.

See also 
 The Black Panthers: Vanguard of the Revolution

References

External links

Spartacus Educational bio
 Video: Kathleen Cleaver oral history interview conducted by Joseph Mosnier in Atlanta, Georgia, 2011-09-16

1945 births
20th-century American women lawyers
20th-century American lawyers
Activists for African-American civil rights
Activists from Texas
African-American women lawyers
American expatriates in Algeria
Barnard College alumni
Cravath, Swaine & Moore people
Emory University faculty
George School alumni
Living people
Members of the Black Panther Party
Oberlin College alumni
People from Dallas
People from Hall County, Texas
Yale Law School alumni